Hotel Sacher is a 1939 German drama film directed by Erich Engel and starring Sybille Schmitz, Willy Birgel, and Wolf Albach-Retty.

The film's sets were designed by the art director Hans Ledersteger  and Hans Richter. It was partly shot on location in Vienna, which had recently been taken over by Nazi Germany. Interior scenes were shot at the Rosenhügel Studios.

Synopsis
Shortly before the First World War at the Hotel Sacher in Vienna, a disgraced Austrian civil servant meets his ex-lover, a female Russian spy.

Cast

See also
 Titanic (A similar nazi propaganda film from 1943, also starring Sybille Schmitz as a Russian socialite)

References

Bibliography

External links 
 

1939 films
1930s historical drama films
German historical drama films
Films of Nazi Germany
1930s German-language films
Films directed by Erich Engel
UFA GmbH films
Films shot in Vienna
Films set in Vienna
Films set in the 1910s
Films set in hotels
Films shot at Rosenhügel Studios
German black-and-white films
1939 drama films
1930s German films